The Bakersfield Open was a golf tournament on the Nike Tour. It ran from 1990 to 1993, and was played in Bakersfield, California. In 1990 and 1991, it was played at Bakersfield Country Club. In 1992 and 1993, it was played at Seven Oaks Country Club. The 1990 event was the first played on the tour, then called the Ben Hogan Tour.

Winners

Bolded golfers graduated to the PGA Tour via the final Ben Hogan Tour money list.

References

Former Korn Ferry Tour events
Golf in California
Sports in Bakersfield, California
Recurring sporting events established in 1990
Recurring sporting events disestablished in 1993
1990 establishments in California
1993 disestablishments in California